State of the Art: Film Writings 1983–1985 is the eighth collection of movie reviews by the American critic Pauline Kael.

In the Author's Note at the beginning of this collection she wrote: 
"The title of this book is a deliberate break with my sexually tinged titles of the past. It seemed time for a change; this has not been a period for anything like Grand Passions.  I hope that State of the Art will sound ominous and sweeping and just slightly clinical. What I try to get at in this collection of reviews from June 1983 to July 1985 is the state of the art of moviemaking. And despite the dubious state of the art[..]there has always been something to recommend."

Kael reviews 117 films in this eighth collection. She gives rich praise to the work of performers and directors she admires, for example, Molly Ringwald's performance in Sixteen Candles, - Steve Martin, Robin Williams, and Nick Nolte, ( three perennial Kael favourites),  and Luchino Visconti, for his work on The Leopard - "The Leopard is so beautifully felt that it calls up a whole culture. It casts an intelligent spell - intelligent and rapturous." (Though  Visconti's film had originally been released in 1963, Kael is here reviewing the release of a full length three hours and five minutes version). And she's typically cool to work she regards as second rate; 'When you come out of Desperately Seeking Susan, you don't want to know who the director is - you want to know who the perpetrator is.'  And Steven Spielberg's segment of Twilight Zone: The Movie - a, " lump of ironclad whimsy. It's as if Steven Spielberg had sat down and thought out what he could do that would make his detractors happiest."  And Sylvester Stallone's work on Staying Alive; "What can be done about this mock writer-director-producer-actor? He has become the stupidos' Orson Welles."  

Films she recommends in this eighth collection include The Survivors, The Grey Fox, The Leopard, Under Fire, Heart Like a Wheel, Yentl,  Choose Me, Splash, Moscow on the Hudson, Indiana Jones and the Temple of Doom, Repo Man, Dreamscape, Carmen, Utu, Stop Making Sense, A Soldier's Story, Comfort and Joy, Independence Day, Mrs. Soffel, A Passage to India, Micki + Maude, The Makioka Sisters, The Return of the Soldier, A Private Function, The Purple Rose of Cairo, Heartbreakers, Lost in America, Ghare Baire, Prizzi's Honor, The Shooting Party.

The book is out-of-print in the United States, but is still published by Marion Boyars Publishers in the United Kingdom.

Films reviewed

 The Man with Two Brains OctopussyFlashdance
 Superman II  Trading Places Betrayal
 The Survivors Twilight Zone: The Movie
 Zelig The Grey Fox
 The Draughtsman's Contract Staying Alive
 Pauline at the Beach Risky Business Daniel
 Moon in the Gutter The Leopard
 Cross Creek Lonely Hearts
 The Right Stuff The Big Chill
 Under Fire
 Heart Like a Wheel  Educating Rita
 Yentl  Star 80
 Terms of Endearment Never Cry Wolf
 Scarface
 Silkwood  To Be or Not To Be
 The Dresser  Uncommon ValorSudden Impact
 Broadway Danny RoseBasileus Quartet
 The Lonely Guy El Norte  Blame It on Rio
 Entre Nous  Footloose

 Splash Against All Odds
 Greystoke: The Legend of Tarzan, Lord of the Apes  Racing with the Moon Unfaithfully Yours
 Moscow on the Hudson
 Iceman  Romancing the Stone
 Swing Shift
 The Natural Sixteen Candles
 Indiana Jones and the Temple of Doom  Eréndira The Bounty
 Gremlins Ghostbusters
 The Fourth Man Star Trek III: The Search for SpockUnder the Volcano
 The Pope of Greenwich Village
 The Bostonians Repo Man
 Purple Rain  The Adventures of Buckaroo Banzai
 All of Me Sheena  First Name: Carmen
 Dreamscape Country Swann in Love Tightrope
 Utu Places in the Heart
 Amadeus Carmen
 The Little Drummer Girl  Stranger Than Paradise Body Double
 Stop Making Sense Comfort and Joy  A Soldier's Story

 The Killing Fields Falling in Love  Independence Day
 Dune   Beverly Hills Cop  Choose Me
 Mrs. Soffel  The Cotton Club
 A Passage to India
 Micki + Maude Starman  The Flamingo Kid
 The Falcon and the SnowmanBirdy
 Witness  Blood Simple
 The Makioka Sisters  The Return of the Soldier The Mean Season
 The Purple Rose of Cairo  A Private Function
 Lost in America   The Breakfast Club
 Heartbreakers  Desperately Seeking Susan
 Ladyhawke
 Once Upon a Time in America
 What Have I Done to Deserve This? Dangerous Moves A View to a Kill Stick
 The Shooting Party  Rambo: First Blood Part II
 Prizzi's Honor   Ghare Baire

Editions
Pub: E. P. Dutton, 1985, hardcover
Pub: Plume, 1985, soft cover
Pub: Marion Boyars, 1987, hardbound
Pub: Marion Boyars, 1998 (new ed), paperback

1985 non-fiction books
Books of film criticism
Books about film
Books by Pauline Kael
American non-fiction books
E. P. Dutton books
Plume (publisher) books